Dom Rudesind Barlow OSB (1585–1656) was an English Benedictine monk, a recusant academic, and Rector of the English College in Douai.

Life
He was born William Barlow, the third son of Sir Alexander Barlow of Barlow Hall, Chorlton, in the county of Lancashire, England, and his wife, Mary Brereton. William Barlow was educated with his younger brother Edward at the English College in Douai. (His brother became Ambrose Barlow and is venerated as one of the Forty Martyrs of England and Wales.)

Wishing to become a Benedictine, Barlow joined the Spanish congregation in 1604 at which time he was given the religious name by which he is now known, being professed at Cella Nueva in Galicia in 1605. Ordained a Catholic priest in 1608 he graduated with the degree of Doctor of Divinity at Salamanca. In 1611 he transferred to join the community of English monks at the Priory of St Gregory the Great in Douai (now Downside Abbey in England), where he was made its prior in 1614. Two years later he was also appointed a professor of theology at St. Vaast College of the University of Douai, a house of studies for the monks of the Abbey of St. Vaast, motherhouse of Douai Priory. He held this office for forty years.

From 1621 to 1629 Barlow served as the President General of the English Benedictine Congregation. In 1633 he became titular Cathedral-Prior of Canterbury. Beyond a circular letter to the English Benedictines about their relations with the Vicar Apostolic of England, none of his writings survive. According to Dom Ralph Weldon, Barlow was looked on as a leading theologian and canonist; and effectively opposed Richard Smith, who claimed leadership of the English Roman Catholics, in becoming Bishop of Chalcedon. On the death of William Bishop, the first Vicar Apostolic of England, Barlow was consulted by the pope as to the best successor, and recommended Smith; but later he differed on the question of the extent of the vicar's jurisdiction.

References

Attribution

1585 births
1656 deaths
English expatriates in France
University of Salamanca alumni
English Benedictines
17th-century English Roman Catholic priests
17th-century English Roman Catholic theologians